William Cleveland Currie (November 29, 1926 – October 30, 2013) was an American professional baseball player. He was a right-handed pitcher whose ten-year minor league career was punctuated by a three-game stint in Major League Baseball with the  Washington Senators.

His brief trial with Washington in April 1955, however, was marked by his rude treatment by the New York Yankees in his MLB debut at Yankee Stadium. Currie entered the game (the Senators' second of the year) in the fifth inning as his team's third pitcher of the day with New York already leading 7–0. He loaded the bases on two walks and a hit batsman and gave up a two-run single to Whitey Ford in his first inning. Then, in his next frame, he gave up back-to-back home runs to Yogi Berra and Bill Skowron  as the Yanks added on four more runs. Currie gave up five hits and five earned runs in two innings, with two bases on balls, one hit batter, and one wild pitch in an eventual 19–1 Washington defeat.

Currie pitched much more effectively in his next two outings, also as a relief pitcher, but he was sent back to the Double-A Southern Association when the rosters were reduced from 28 to 25 players. In his three MLB games, he yielded seven hits and six earned runs in 4⅓ innings pitched, with two walks and two strikeouts.

References

External links

1926 births
2013 deaths
Asheville Tourists players
Atlanta Crackers players
Baseball players from Georgia (U.S. state)
Charleston ChaSox players
Chattanooga Lookouts players
Concord Weavers players
Fort Lauderdale Lions players
Louisville Colonels (minor league) players
Major League Baseball pitchers
Memphis Chickasaws players
Miami Beach Flamingos players
People from Arlington, Georgia
People from Calhoun County, Georgia
Savannah Redlegs players
Tulsa Oilers (baseball) players
Washington Senators (1901–1960) players
Waycross Bears players